

Dinosaurs

Newly named dinosaurs
Data courtesy of George Olshevsky's dinosaur genera list.

Plesiosaurs
 Plesiosaur gastroliths documented.

Synapsids

Non-mammalian

Metatherians

Eutherians

Cetaceans

Even-toed Ungulates

References 

 Brown, B. (1904) Stomach stones and food of plesiosaurs, Science, n.s. 20, (501): 184-185
 Sanders F, Manley K, Carpenter K. Gastroliths from the Lower Cretaceous sauropod Cedarosaurus weiskopfae. In: Tanke D.H, Carpenter K, editors. Mesozoic vertebrate life: new research inspired by the paleontology of Philip J. Currie. Indiana University Press; Bloomington, IN: 2001. pp. 166–180.
 Williston, Samuel Wendel; 1904; The stomach stones of the plesiosaurs; Science; 20 pp. 565; American Association for the Advancement of Science